Flaviflexus ciconiae is a Gram-positive, non-spore-forming  and strictly aerobic bacterium from the genus of Flaviflexus which has been isolated from the faeces of the stork Ciconia boyciana from the Seoul Grand Park Zoo in Korea.

References

Actinomycetales
Bacteria described in 2020